The Clockwork Fable is the sixth studio album by the English progressive rock band Gandalf's Fist. Released on 1 May 2016, it is a three disc spanning rock-opera interspersed with a professionally acted radio play between the actual songs. Each disc of the record serves as an individual element of a traditional three-act structure.

Reception

Classic Rock Magazine's Geoff Barton wrote "a conceptional tour de force, it reduces Rick Wakeman's The Myths and Legends of King Arthur and the Knights of the Round Table to the level of a Chas & Dave Cockney knees-up." in his review in issue 224, awarding it 9/10 Points.

Prog Magazine's Steve Pilkington writes "[...] Imagine The War Of The Worlds if it had been tackled by Ayreon rather than Jeff Wayne and you’re halfway there. Indeed, Arjen Lucassen’s just one of the guests here, along with Blaze Bayley (Iron Maiden), and prog-savvy actors Mark Benton and Zach ‘Gremlins’ Galligan. [...] this is a career-defining, magical epic."

Fireworks Magazine writes "[...] lengthy progressive epics [...] nothing short of stunning. [...] If you love 70s prog with an eye for Jethro Tull, Genesis and the Pop leanings of Greg Lake, the 80s update the likes of IQ, Galahad or Twelfth Night provided, or even the more pointed stabs of Porcupine Tree, you'll find them all here. As you will a slice of Prog Metal technicality and hefty helping of intrinsically British NWOBHM fret fury – and obviously the storytelling of War Of The Worlds. [...] an album that genuinely deserves to be given the accolade of current and future classic. Conceptual, progressive rock, genuinely doesn't get better than this."

Track listing
All songs written and composed by Dean Marsh, except where noted. All Lead vocals by Dean Marsh, except where noted.

The Cast 

The Orchestra
Dean Marsh – 6 and 12 String Electric Guitars, Synths, Mandolin, Octave Mandola, and Bass
Luke Severn – Lead and Backing Vocals
Stefan Hepe –  Drums, Percussion
Christopher Ewen – Bass Guitar
with
Matt Stevens – Ambient Guitars
Dave Oberlé - Bodhran and Tan-Tan
Nathan Madsen - Saxophone

The Choir
Dean Marsh - sung words of "The Good People of Cogtopolis"
Luke Severn - sung words of "The Nightkeepers"
Arjen Lucassen - sung words of "Armistead" 
Blaze Bayley - sung words of "The Primarch"
Dave Oberlé - sung words of "Pastor Simon"
Melissa Hollick - sung words of "Eve"
Dying Seed - background chants

Voice Actors
Mark Benton - as "The Lamplighter/Prison Guard/First Secretary"
Zach Galligan - as "The Steam Ranger"
Tim Munro - as "The Tinker"
Alicia Marsh - as "Eve"
Paul Kavanagh - as "Pastor Simon"
Bill Fellows - as "Armistead/Nightkeeper Spy"
Paul Barnhill - as "The Primarch/Nightkeeper Breathren"
Christopher Ewen - as "The Boy"
Luke Severn - as "Second Secretary/another Nightkeeper Brethren"
You, The Listener - as "The Traveler"

References

2016 albums
Gandalf's Fist albums